The Purdy Villa is a historic U.S. home in Eustis, Florida. It is located at 3045 Eudora Road. On March 10, 2004, it was added to the U.S. National Register of Historic Places.

References

External links
 Lake County listings at National Register of Historic Places
 Lake County listings at Florida's Office of Cultural and Historical Programs
 Purdy villa at Florida's History Through Its Places

Houses on the National Register of Historic Places in Florida
National Register of Historic Places in Lake County, Florida
Houses in Lake County, Florida
Eustis, Florida